The 1998 Sydney International was a tennis tournament played on outdoor hard courts at the NSW Tennis Centre in Sydney, Australia that was part of the International Series of the 1998 ATP Tour and of Tier II of the 1998 WTA Tour. The tournament was held from 11 through 17 January 1998.

Finals

Men's singles

 Karol Kučera defeated  Tim Henman, 7–5, 6–4.
 It was Kučera's 1st title of the year and the 3rd of his career.

Women's singles

 Arantxa Sánchez-Vicario defeated  Venus Williams, 6–1, 6–3.
 It was Sánchez-Vicario's 1st title of the year and the 81st of her career.

Men's doubles

 Todd Woodbridge /  Mark Woodforde defeated  Jacco Eltingh /  Daniel Nestor, 6–3, 7–5.
 It was Woodbridge's 1st title of the year and the 54th of his career. It was Woodforde's 1st title of the year and the 57th of his career.

Women's doubles

 Martina Hingis /  Helena Suková defeated  Katrina Adams /  Meredith McGrath, 6–1, 6–2.
 It was Hingis' 1st title of the year and the 27th of her career. It was Suková's only title of the year and the 83rd of her career.

References

External links
 ATP tournament profile
 WTA tournament profile

 
Sydney International, 1998